Lake Burragorang is a man-made reservoir in the lower Blue Mountains of New South Wales, Australia, serving as a major water supply for greater metropolitan Sydney.

Lake Burragorang is  within the World Heritage Site of the Greater Blue Mountains Area. The  reservoir collects water from the converged flows of the Coxs, Kowmung, Nattai, Wingecarribee, Wollondilly, and Warragamba rivers and their associated tributaries, all within the Nepean and Hawkesbury River catchment.

Pre-lake history

Before the construction of the dam, Burragorang Valley had been inhabited by white settlers since the 19th century, and for thousands of years before, the Burragorang valley was part of the tribal lands of the Gundungarra nation, an indigenous tribe that called the Burragorang valley, along with the Blue Mountains and Megalong Valley, their tribal land. A number of farming towns (including the town of Burragorang) and coal mines were located in the area. All of these are now underwater. Construction of Warragamba dam commenced in 1948 and was completed in 1960.

Capacity

There are fears, however, that population pressures may stretch the reservoir's ability to furnish Sydney residents with needed water well into the 21st century. The city's population is rising by about 50,000 every year. Water restrictions (limited usage purposes and times), were imposed late in 2003 and are reapplied during serious droughts, which are expected to become more frequent.

There have been times when the reservoir has become seriously depleted. On 8 February 2007 the lake recorded an all-time low of 32.5% of capacity, although by late 2008 the water level had returned to 60% of capacity. To reduce the likelihood of a water supply failure, the NSW Government authorised the construction and operation of the Sydney Desalination Plant to augment Sydney's water supply.

The dam reached maximum capacity and spilled in March 2012, the first time it had done so in fourteen years. This is consistent with increasingly extreme weather events, where longer periods of drought and reduced total rainfall, is expected to be punctuated with shorter, heavier and more sporadic downfalls events.

In November 2019, government proposed a $700 million plan to raise the height of the dam by 14 metres. The purpose is stated as providing flood mitigation for downstream land. Critics have alleged it may be to allow rezoning of prime agricultural in the flood zone, to residential property for commercial developers. Increasing the capacity would result in flooding large areas of native wildlife habitat, in a relatively protected water catchment area. It would also flood large areas of native vegetation, that provides a substantial carbon dioxide sink, without proposal for replacement. The announcement was made while an application for concessions to extend mining operations inside the drinking water catchment areas, is under consideration. In the first week of December 2019, the water catchment area experienced large bush fires, during a widespread and extreme fire season in Eastern Australia.

Public access

There are two access corridors for bushwalkers:  Coxs River to Mount Cookem, and Belloon Pass to Yerranderie. Limited public vehicle access is allowed on fire trail W4 from Sheahys Creek to Yerranderie.

Power station
A hydroelectric power station at Warragamba Dam begins operating once the level in the reservoir reaches to within  of full capacity.

Statistical overview

See also

 List of Blue Mountains articles

References

External links 
 Sydney Catchment Authority - Warragamba Dam
 Sydney's Dam Levels - current statistics and graphs

Macarthur (New South Wales)
Reservoirs in New South Wales
Sydney Water
Warragamba, New South Wales